FE10 may refer to:

Video games
 Fire Emblem: Radiant Dawn, the tenth game in the Fire Emblem series

Photography
 Nikon FE10, an electric companion model for the Nikon FM10